The Slambovian Circus of Dreams is a Hudson Valley, New York based band which was founded in Sleepy Hollow in 1998. The band's music is a form of folk rock, americana and is sometimes described as "Hillbilly Pink Floyd," or "Punk Classical Hillbilly Floyd. Their sixth studio album, A Very Unusual Head was released Jan 2022 on their own label, Storm King Records and in May 2022 on Talking Elephant Records for UK/EU release. A Box of Everything a greatest hits compilation was released April 1, 2014, on the Red River Entertainment label.

The band regularly plays the major americana/folk venues, clubs, theaters, and music festivals in the Northeastern, and East North Central United States and Canada. They also tour in other regions of the United States, including California and Florida. In August 2008 they made their first appearance outside of North America, at the Rhythm Festival in England. Their reception there was so enthusiastic that they were invited back for the 2009 festival, as well as several other UK festivals in the summer of 2009. The band performed at Glastonbury Festival in 2010 and toured the UK in subsequent years.The band returns to the UK in August of 2022. Performances include the legendary Fairport Cropredy Festival, Wickham Festival and several high profile venues.

The vibe of the band is best captured by a live concert, or in live recordings. The band is noted for the dedication and support shown by fans.
Some fans travel hundreds of miles to attend concerts. A high point of the year for many fans are the band's Halloween shows (Grand Slambovian Hillbilly Pirate Ball, Grand Slambovian Surrealist Ball, Rock'n'Roll Seance, etc.)and Very Slambovian Christmas shows.

Members
The band's current lineup is:
Joziah Longo – lead vocals, guitar, harmonica
Sharkey McEwen – lead guitar, backing vocals, mandolin
Tink Lloyd – accordion, cello, flute, piccolo, theremin, backing vocals.
Bob Torsello – bass
RJ McCarty – keyboards, bass, guitar, saxophone, banjo, backing vocals
Matthew Abourezk – drums

Tony Zuzulo was a founding member of the group and the band's drummer from 1998 to January 2012.

Eric Puente – drums and percussion 2012 – 2016

Felipe Torres– 2016 - 2021

History
In the late 1980s and early 1990s Joziah, Tink, and Sharkey were members of a progressive rock band called The Ancestors, which released 3 albums.
The Ancestors (1988)
The Enemies Dance (1991)
Brigadoon (1994)

Tracks on Brigadoon were produced by Eddie Kramer.

Other members of The Ancestors included Bob Muller (of the Trey Gunn Band), and Alistair Farrant.

The Ancestors had some degree of success but the band broke up in 1995, and they took a hiatus from the music industry. During that hiatus Joziah and Tink took courses in computer graphic design and video production at the Westchester Community College, SUNY and met Tony Zuzulo, who was one of their multi-media professors. In 1998 they formed The Circus and added Tony when they discovered that he was a drummer after class one day...

Discography
{|class="wikitable"
!Year
!Title
!Comments
|-
|1999
|A Good Thief Tips His Hat
|Studio recording
|-
|2000
|Live from WDST - Acoustic Breakfast
|Live recording. Out of print.
|-
|2000
|Suddenly It's Christmas
|CD single.
|-
|2001
|Live at the Towne Crier
|Live recording. Out of print, but available from iTunes.
|-
|2004
|Flapjacks from the Sky
| Studio recording
|-others
|2005
|A Night at the Puppet House
|Live recording.
|-
|2005
|The Christmas Show 2004
|Live recording.
|-
|2005
|Flapjacks from the Sky 12" vinyl| Studio recording
|-
|2006
|"Flapjacks from the Sky" Concert DVD – Live at The Depot Theatre|Live DVD of a performance of the entire Flapjacks album
|-
|2007
|Falcon Ridge Folk Festival, Hillsdale NY - July 21, 2006|Live recording.
|-
|2007
|Roots on the River, Bellows Falls, VT - June 9, 2007|Live recording.
|-
|2007
|Ancient Murphy Greatest Hits of the 20th Century|A collection of tracks by a previous incarnation of the band as The Ancestors.
|-
|2008
|The Great Unravel|Studio recording
|-
|2008
|A Very Slambovian Christmas|Live Recording
|-
|2010
|The Circus Does Dylan|Live Recording
|-
|2011
|The Grand Slambovians|Studio recording
|-
|2013
|Folk!|Studio recording
|-
|2014
|Box Of Everything|Compilation and one studio recording
|-
|2022
|A Very Unusual Head''
|Studio recording
|}

See also

References

External links

American folk rock groups
Rock music groups from New York (state)
Musical groups established in 1998